Sputnik 1 was the first artificial satellite, launched October 1957.

Sputnik may also refer to:

Places
 Sputnik (rural locality), a list of rural localities in Russia
 Sputnik, Murmansk Oblast, Russia
 Sputnik Islands, Ob' Bay, Antarctica
 Sputnik Planitia, a plain on Pluto
 16260 Sputnik, an asteroid

People
 Sputnik (singer) or Knut T. Storbukås (born 1943), Norwegian country singer
 Sputnik Källström (1939-2009), Swedish race car driver
 Sputnik Monroe (1928-2006), American professional wrestler
 Sputnik Weazel (born 1960), British singer
 Sputnik (artist), a Swedish musician who most notably involves in a solo project called Weatherday.

Fictional characters
 Sputnik, a character from Astroblast!
 Sputnik (comics), a character from Marvel Comics

Vehicles and transportation
 Sputnik (rocket), an unmanned orbital carrier rocket derived from the R-7 Semyorka ICBM
 Sputnik; GRAU index 11A59; a rocket otherwise called Polyot (rocket)
 Sputnik (spacecraft designation)
 Sputnik (train), a Moscow oblast train service using an electric multiple unit
 Lada Sputnik, an automobile
 Trabant Sputnik, an automobile
 New South Wales Sputnik suburban carriage stock, an electric multiple unit

Film and television
 Sputnik (film), a 2020 Russian science fiction horror film
 Sputnik (TV programme), a 2013 British television programme
 TV 2 Sputnik, a Danish on-demand TV channel

Music
 Sputnik (album), a 2018 album by Luca Carboni
 "Sputnik", a 2015 song by Public Service Broadcasting from The Race for Space
 "Sputnik", a 2018 song by Luca Carboni off the eponymous album Sputnik (album)
 The Spotnicks, a Swedish instrumental rock group

Sports
 FC Sputnik Buguruslan, a Russian football team
 FC Sputnik Kimry, a Russian football team
 FC Sputnik Rechitsa, a Russian football team
 Sputnik Nizhny Tagil, a Russian ice hockey team
 Kohtla-Järve Viru Sputnik, an Estonian ice hockey team

Other media
 Sputnik (magazine), a former Soviet magazine published in multiple languages
 Sputnik Monthly Digest, the English language edition of Спутник
 Sputnik (news agency), a news agency operated by the Russian government
 Sputnik (radio station), a public German radio station
 Radio Sputnik (disambiguation)

Other uses
 Sputnik (JavaScript conformance test)
 Sputnik (search engine), a search engine owned by Rostelecom
 Sputnik V (Gam-COVID-Vac), a COVID-19 vaccine from Russia
 Sputnik virophage
 IZh-59 "Sputnik", a Soviet double-barreled shotgun

See also

 Sputnikmusic, a music website